Meibomeus is a genus of pea and bean weevils in the beetle family Chrysomelidae. There are about 12 described species in Meibomeus.

Species
These 12 species belong to the genus Meibomeus:

 Meibomeus desmoportheus Kingsolver & Whitehead, 1976
 Meibomeus dirli Romero & Johnson
 Meibomeus jacki Romero & Johnson
 Meibomeus juarez Romero & Johnson
 Meibomeus kirki Romero & Johnson
 Meibomeus minimus Silva & Ribeiro-Costa, 2001
 Meibomeus musculus (Say, 1831)
 Meibomeus petrolinae Silva & Ribeiro-Costa, 2001
 Meibomeus rodneyi Romero & Johnson
 Meibomeus spinifer Silva & Ribeiro-Costa, 2001
 Meibomeus sulinus Silva & Ribeiro-Costa, 2001
 Meibomeus surrubresus (Pic, 1933)

References

Bruchinae
Articles created by Qbugbot
Chrysomelidae genera